In mathematics, a complex structure on a real vector space V is an automorphism of V that squares to the minus identity, −I. Such a structure on V allows one to define multiplication by complex scalars in a canonical fashion so as to regard V as a complex vector space.

Every complex vector space can be equipped with a compatible complex structure, however, there is in general no canonical such structure. Complex structures have applications in representation theory as well as in complex geometry where they play an essential role in the definition of almost complex manifolds, by contrast to complex manifolds.  The term "complex structure" often refers to this structure on manifolds; when it refers instead to a structure on vector spaces, it may be called a linear complex structure.

Definition and properties

A complex structure on a real vector space V is a real linear transformation

such that

This is reminiscent of multiplication by the imaginary unit, . A complex structure allows one to endow  with the structure of a complex vector space. Complex scalar multiplication can be defined by

One can check that this does, in fact, give  the structure of a complex vector space which we denote .

Going in the other direction, if one starts with a complex vector space  then one can define a complex structure on the underlying real space by defining  for all .

More formally, a linear complex structure on a real vector space is an algebra representation of the complex numbers , thought of as an associative algebra over the real numbers. This algebra is realized concretely as 

If  has complex dimension  then  must have real dimension . That is, a finite-dimensional space  admits a complex structure only if it is even-dimensional. It is not hard to see that every even-dimensional vector space admits a complex structure. If  is a basis for the complex vector space  then  is a basis for the underlying real space .

Examples

Elementary example
The collection of 2x2 real matrices M(2,R) over the real field is 4-dimensional. Any matrix
 with a2 + bc = –1
has square equal to the negative of the identity matrix. A complex structure may be formed in M(2,R): with identity matrix I, elements x I + y J, with matrix multiplication form complex numbers.

Cn 
The fundamental example of a linear complex structure is the structure on R2n coming from the complex structure on Cn. That is, the complex n-dimensional space Cn is also a real 2n-dimensional space – using the same vector addition and real scalar multiplication – while multiplication by the complex number i is not only a complex linear transform of the space, thought of as a complex vector space, but also a real linear transform of the space, thought of as a real vector space. Concretely, this is because scalar multiplication by i commutes with scalar multiplication by real numbers   – and distributes across vector addition. As a complex n×n matrix, this is simply the scalar matrix with i on the diagonal. The corresponding real 2n×2n matrix is denoted J.

Given a basis  for the complex space, this set, together with these vectors multiplied by i, namely  form a basis for the real space.

If one orders the basis as  then the matrix for J takes the block diagonal form (subscripts added to indicate dimension):

This ordering is more natural if one thinks of the complex space as a direct sum of real spaces, as discussed below.

The data of the real vector space and the J matrix is exactly the same as the data of the complex vector space, as the J matrix allows one to define complex multiplication. At the level of Lie algebras and Lie groups, this corresponds to the inclusion of gl(n,C) in gl(2n,R) (Lie algebras – matrices, not necessarily invertible) and GL(n,C) in GL(2n,R):

The inclusion corresponds to forgetting the complex structure (and keeping only the real), while the subgroup GL(n,C) can be characterized (given in equations) as the matrices that commute with J:

The corresponding statement about Lie algebras is that the subalgebra gl(n,C) of complex matrices are those whose Lie bracket with J vanishes, meaning  in other words, as the kernel of the map of bracketing with J, 

Direct sum 
If V is any real vector space there is a canonical complex structure on the direct sum V ⊕ V given by

The block matrix form of J is

where  is the identity map on V. This corresponds to the complex structure on the tensor product

Compatibility with other structures

If  is a bilinear form on  then we say that  preserves  if

for all . An equivalent characterization is that  is skew-adjoint with respect to :

If  is an inner product on  then  preserves  if and only if  is an orthogonal transformation. Likewise,  preserves a nondegenerate, skew-symmetric form  if and only if  is a symplectic transformation (that is, if ).

Because a symplectic form is nondegenerate, so is the associated bilinear form. The associated form is preserved by  if and only if the symplectic form is.

Relation to complexifications
Given any real vector space V we may define its complexification by extension of scalars:

This is a complex vector space whose complex dimension is equal to the real dimension of V. It has a canonical complex conjugation defined by

If J is a complex structure on V, we may extend J by linearity to VC:

Since C is algebraically closed, J is guaranteed to have eigenvalues which satisfy λ2 = −1, namely λ = ±i.  Thus we may write

where V+ and V− are the eigenspaces of +i and −i, respectively. Complex conjugation interchanges V+ and V−. The projection maps onto the V± eigenspaces are given by

So that

There is a natural complex linear isomorphism between VJ and V+, so these vector spaces can be considered the same, while V− may be regarded as the complex conjugate of VJ.

Note that if VJ has complex dimension n then both V+ and V− have complex dimension n while VC has complex dimension 2n.

Abstractly, if one starts with a complex vector space W and takes the complexification of the underlying real space, one obtains a space isomorphic to the direct sum of W and its conjugate:

Extension to related vector spaces 

Let V be a real vector space with a complex structure J. The dual space V* has a natural complex structure J* given by the dual (or transpose) of J. The complexification of the dual space (V*)C therefore has a natural decomposition

into the ±i eigenspaces of J*. Under the natural identification of (V*)C with (VC)* one can characterize (V*)+ as those complex linear functionals which vanish on V−. Likewise (V*)− consists of those complex linear functionals which vanish on V+.

The (complex) tensor, symmetric, and exterior algebras over VC also admit decompositions. The exterior algebra is perhaps the most important application of this decomposition. In general, if a vector space U admits a decomposition U = S ⊕ T then the exterior powers of U can be decomposed as follows:

A complex structure J on V therefore induces a decomposition

where

All exterior powers are taken over the complex numbers. So if VJ has complex dimension n (real dimension 2n) then

The dimensions add up correctly as a consequence of Vandermonde's identity.

The space of (p,q)-forms Λp,q VJ*  is the space of (complex) multilinear forms on VC which vanish on homogeneous elements unless p are from V+ and q are from V−. It is also possible to regard Λp,q VJ* as the space of real multilinear maps from VJ to C which are complex linear in p terms and conjugate-linear in q terms.

See complex differential form and almost complex manifold for applications of these ideas.

See also
 Almost complex manifold
 Complex manifold
 Complex differential form
 Complex conjugate vector space
 Hermitian structure
 Real structure

References
 Kobayashi S. and Nomizu K., Foundations of Differential Geometry, John Wiley & Sons, 1969. . (complex structures are discussed in Volume II, Chapter IX, section 1).
 Budinich, P. and Trautman, A. The Spinorial Chessboard, Springer-Verlag, 1988. . (complex structures are discussed in section 3.1).
 Goldberg S.I., Curvature and Homology, Dover Publications, 1982. . (complex structures and almost complex manifolds are discussed in section 5.2).

Structures on manifolds